Sky Pilot  Creek is a river in the Hudson Bay drainage basin in Northern Manitoba, Canada. It flows from Sky Pilot Lake to the Nelson River, which it enters as a left tributary immediately downstream of the Long Spruce Generating Station and dam. It passes twice under Manitoba Provincial Road 280: once near its source, and once just before its mouth.

See also
List of rivers of Manitoba

References

Rivers of Northern Manitoba
Tributaries of Hudson Bay